F126 or frigate 126 (Fregatte 126) is a planned German frigate class intended to replace the F123 s in the German Navy. The ships are to be the largest surface warships to join the Navy since World War II. The first ship is planned to be commissioned in 2028.

Until 1 January 2021, the project was known under the working title MKS 180 or Multi-Purpose Combat Ship 180 (Mehrzweckkampfschiff 180), with 180 indicating the classes planned complement.

Characteristics 

The class is to be mission modular and is capable of accommodating so-called mission modules which include devices, space, sensors and weaponry necessary to carry out a given task optimally. If not in use, the modules can be maintained and replaced separate from the ship and also be exchanged between different ships in the class.

The ships are planned to replace the Brandenburg-class in their anti-submarine warfare role if fitted with a modular towed array sonar (the ASW module).

Similar to the  however, they will also be able to stay at sea for up to two years without requiring maintenance at port, with crews rotating to and from the deployed ship every four months. This capability is expected to allow for a more efficient use of hulls by reducing the time spent during transfer from Germany to conflict zones such as the sea off the Horn of Africa where German ships repeatedly took part in counter-piracy missions such as Operation Atalanta, patrolling large areas for a long time. In this case, the "detention module" enables the crew to detain suspects and if need be quarantine them in a purpose-built medical facility.

Other intended uses are the enforcement of embargoes, escorting merchant shipping or commanding maritime task forces. In 2015, modules for mine countermeasures (MCM) and a diving chamber were planned as well.

Project history

Competitive evaluation and design selection 
First studies for a class of future surface ships were initiated in 2009. At the time, the goal was to develop a replacement for the 143A Gepard class fast attack craft. In reference to the five K130 class corvettes which were set to replace the older 143 Albatros class, the project was termed MÜKE (Mittlere Überwasserkampfeinheit) or K131. Eight ships were planned to join the navy by the early 2020s and then be available into the 2050s.

The ships were to be mission modular. The Navy, increasingly tasked with conducting long overseas deployments with an aging fleet of ships influenced by cold war requirements, wished to obtain flexible ships that could be rapidly modified depending on need. This design driver, also influencing the Baden-Württemberg class frigates at the time, caused the projected design to increase in displacement and complement compared to a typical corvette. By early 2011, the project was therefore expected to result in a "Multi-Role Combat Ship" (Mehrzweckkampfschiff). On March 25, 2013, the detailed requirements were formally decided on.

During the following analysis phase, three designs were suggested, one fulfilling all requirements and two other less expensive ones fulfilling them partially. On June 8, 2015, the fully compliant design was selected. By 2015 the number of ships had been cut to four with the first hull entering service by 2023 at a planned total cost of around 4 billion Euros and two more ships in a potential second batch. Crucially, the MKS 180 project had now grown to be the replacement for the four aging F123 Brandenburg class frigates, representing the Navies primary anti-submarine warfare (ASW) capability.

The 2015 tender was open for bids from European companies, with Minister of Defence Ursula von der Leyen deciding not to prevent foreign bidders from participating under national security reasons. Several companies participated, among them:

 BAE Systems and German Naval Yards
 Damen Group and Blohm + Voss
 Thyssenkrupp Marine Systems and Lürssen

In mid 2017, BAE Systems, offering a ship based on the Type 26, withdrew from the tender and in March 2018 the German government excluded the Thyssenkrupp/Lürssen consortium. Thyssenkrupp Marine Systems then partnered as a subcontractor to German Naval Yards, while Lürssen effectively became a partner to Damen, having acquired Blohm + Voss in 2016.

In January 2020 after a five year long bidding process the Dutch Damen Group won the tender, although the ships will be constructed at the Blohm + Voss shipyard in Hamburg, Germany and at the Peene-shipyard in Wolgast, Germany, both owned by Lürssen Group. German Naval Yards protested the award, delaying the required legally binding contract signature. However, the company withdrew its protest when it and Lürssen announced they would pool their naval shipbuilding in a joint venture and that the Kiel shipyard would participate in construction.

Contract award 
The contract was signed on June 17, 2020. In June 2020 the German parliaments budgetary committee officially cleared 6 billion Euros for the first four ships and two options with the first ship planned to be commissioned by 2027. The contract awarded to Damen covers the ships, training facilities as well as two ASW and two detention modules and amounts to 5,48 billion Euros while weapons are contracted separately. Initial operating capability for the ships - to be based in Wilhelmshaven - is expected in 2028.

Thales at its facilities in the Netherlands and Germany will provide radar, IT and fire control systems, in particular the Tacticos combat management system and the AWWS (above water warfare system) fire control solution. In November 2020, the provider of the underwater warfare suite had yet to be decided.

Wärtsila SAM Electronics in Hamburg will integrate the ships electrical systems while Canadian company OSI Maritime is delivering the navigation suite and Rolls-Royce unit Power Systems is responsible for the ship platform management and automation systems. ABB was awarded a contract to supply the ships DC power system. Electric drive motors and the gearbox will be provided by Renk.

Construction 
The design is to pass a critical design review in early 2022, after which construction of the first ship will begin in 2023 while keel laying is intended for 2024. Currently no name for the first-of-class ship has been chosen.

While the fore ships will be constructed in Wolgast, the aft ships will be built in Kiel where both will be joined. Fitting, tests and trials are to take place in Hamburg. The Hamburg Ship Model Basin (HSVA) is conducting model-based flow testing.

Controversy over contract award 

Daniel Günther, Minister President of the state of Schleswig-Holstein where Kiel is located, complained in public over the decision to engage in a European tender, considering German know-how and jobs to be threatened by the governments decision. He reiterated that the construction of surface warfare ships ought to be listed as a "key technology" (Schlüsseltechnologie) which would formalise the governments ability (but not obligation) to exclude tenders on surface ships from EU competition law. According to Schleswig-Holsteins Minister of the Economy, Bernd Buchholz (FDP), this is a common practise in other European countries where government can even directly own stakes in national shipyards. He especially criticized that knowledge-intensive activities such as research and development would be occurring in the Netherlands.

The union of metalworkers (IG Metall) and labour councils in shipyards and maritime subcontractors also criticized the decision, considering 15.000 jobs to be threatened in a call on the government to protect shipyards, jobs and engage with industry to bring about a "restructurization" of shipbuilding in Germany.

On February 12, 2020, the cabinet decided to include the construction of surface ships among key technologies. The intention to do so had already been formalized during negotiations between the governing parties SPD and CDU/CSU in 2018. This has no impact on the MKS 180 tender, which had already been conducted Europe-wide.

References

Frigate classes